Nemasket Hill Cemetery is a cemetery located in Middleborough, Massachusetts. It was set aside as a burial ground in 1662, and is the oldest in Middleborough. The oldest engraved headstone here (and within the town of Middleborough) is that of Elizabeth Vaughan, who died on June 24, 1693.

The cemetery conducts a "Stroll thru History" annually, in May.

The Nemasket Hill Cemetery Association holds Annual Meetings on the third Saturday in April at the Middleborough Public Library. The meeting are open to the public.

The cemetery has been in continuous operation since it was established. The cemetery was incorporated on March 24, 1885. The Nemasket Cemetery Circle was a group that was active in the early part of the 1900s and they raised funds that financed various cemetery improvement projects. In 1919, a bridge was erected from North Street over the Nemasket River and connected to wooden stairs that ascended the hill to access the cemetery. The bridge is no longer present, but the stairs remain. During the 1920s, a Chapel was built. In 2009, the cemetery added a columbarium.

Notable burials 

Mary Tomson  - daughter of Mayflower passenger Francis Cooke
John Tomson  - husband of Mary and known for the "Tomson long gun"
Samuel Fuller  - the first minister in the Church in Middleborough and son of Mayflower passenger Samuel Fuller
Huldah Newell aka Minnie Warren - sister in law of General Tom Thumb

References

External links 
 Official website of Nemasket Hill Cemetery
 Friends of Middleborough Cemeteries - Nemasket Hill Cemetery
Massachusetts Cultural Resource Information System (MACRIS) = MID815
FindaGrave.com - Nemasket Hill Cemetery

Cemeteries in Plymouth County, Massachusetts
Middleborough, Massachusetts
Cemeteries established in the 17th century
1662 establishments in Massachusetts